The Christianisation of Anglo-Saxon England was a process spanning the 7th century. It was essentially the result of the  Gregorian mission of 597, which was joined by the efforts of the Hiberno-Scottish mission from the 630s. From the 8th century, the Anglo-Saxon mission was, in turn, instrumental in the conversion of the population of the Frankish Empire.

Æthelberht of Kent was the first king to accept baptism, circa 601. He was followed by Saebert of Essex and Rædwald of East Anglia in 604. However, when Æthelberht and Saebert died, in 616, they were both succeeded by pagan sons who were hostile to Christianity and drove the missionaries out, encouraging their subjects to return to their native paganism. Christianity only hung on with Rædwald, who was still worshiping the pagan gods alongside Christ.

The first Archbishops of Canterbury during the first half of the 7th century were members of the original Gregorian mission. The first native Saxon to be consecrated archbishop was Deusdedit of Canterbury, enthroned in 655. The first native Anglo-Saxon bishop was Ithamar, enthroned as Bishop of Rochester in 644.

The decisive shift to Christianity occurred in 655 when King Penda was slain in the  Battle of the Winwaed and Mercia became officially Christian for the first time. The death of Penda also allowed Cenwalh of Wessex to return from exile and return Wessex, another powerful kingdom, to Christianity. After 655, only Sussex and the Isle of Wight remained openly pagan, although Wessex and Essex would later crown pagan kings. In 686, Arwald, the last openly pagan king, was slain in battle, and from this point on all Anglo-Saxon kings were at least nominally Christian (although there is some confusion about the religion of Caedwalla, who ruled Wessex until 688).

Lingering paganism among the common population gradually became English folklore.

Background

Christianity was present in Roman Britain from at least the third century, introduced by tradesmen, immigrants and legionaries, although most of the latter probably followed Mithraism. Diocletian's edicts of persecution, of 303 appear not to have been rigorously enforced by Constantius Chlorus within his territory. In 313, his son, Constantine, emperor in the west, and emperor Licinius issued the "Edict of Milan" allowing the practice of Christianity in the Empire. The following year three bishops from Britain attended the Council of Arles. The British bishops were Eborius from the city of Eboracum (York); Restitutus from the city of Londinium (London); and Adelfius, the location of whose see is uncertain. The presence of these three bishops indicates that by the early fourth century, the British Christian community was already both organised on a regional basis, had a distinct episcopal hierarchy, and had a close dependence on the church of Gaul. Around 429, the bishops of Britain requested assistance from their colleagues in Gaul in dealing with Pelagianism. Germanus of Auxerre and Lupus, Bishop of Troyes were sent. During his sojourn in Britain, Germanus, a former government official, is reported to have led the native Britons to a victory against Pictish and Saxon raiders, at a mountainous site near a river, of which Mold in North Wales is the traditional location.

Kent, 588–640

588: Æthelbert of Kent marries Bertha
In 595, when Pope Gregory I decided to send a mission to convert the Anglo-Saxons to Christianity, the Kingdom of Kent was ruled by Æthelberht. He had married a Christian princess named Bertha before 588, and perhaps earlier than 560. Bertha was the daughter of Charibert I, one of the Merovingian kings of the Franks. As one of the conditions of her marriage she had brought a bishop named Liudhard with her to Kent as her chaplain. They restored a church in Canterbury that dated to Roman times, possibly the present-day St Martin's Church. Æthelberht was at that time a pagan, but he allowed his wife freedom of worship. Liudhard does not appear to have made many converts among the Anglo-Saxons, and if not for the discovery of a gold coin bearing the inscription Leudardus Eps (Eps is an abbreviation of Episcopus, the Latin word for bishop) his existence may have been doubted. One of Bertha's biographers states that influenced by his wife, Æthelberht requested Pope Gregory to send missionaries. The historian Ian Wood feels that the initiative came from the Kentish court as well as the queen.

597: Gregorian mission arrives

The mission landed in Kent in 597, and quickly achieved some initial success: Æthelberht permitted the missionaries to settle and preach in his capital of Canterbury, where they used the church of St. Martin's for services, and this church became the seat of the bishopric. Neither Bede nor Gregory mentions the date of Æthelberht's conversion, but it probably took place in 597. In the early medieval period, the ruler's conversion often presaged the large-scale conversion of subjects, and large numbers of converts are recorded within a year of the mission's arrival in Kent. By 601, Gregory was writing to both Æthelberht and Bertha, calling the king his son and referring to his baptism. A late medieval tradition, recorded by the 15th-century chronicler Thomas Elmham, gives the date of the king's conversion as Whit Sunday, or 2 June 597; there is no reason to doubt this date, but there is no other evidence for it. A letter of Gregory's to Patriarch Eulogius of Alexandria in June 598 mentions the number of converts made but does not mention any baptism of the king in 597, although it is clear that by 601 he had been converted. The royal baptism probably took place at Canterbury, but Bede does not mention the location.

Why Æthelberht chose to convert to Christianity is uncertain. Bede suggests that the king converted strictly for religious reasons, but most modern historians see other motives behind Æthelberht's decision. Certainly, given Kent's close contacts with Gaul, it is possible that Æthelberht sought baptism in order to smooth his relations with the Merovingian kingdoms, or to align himself with one of the factions then contending in Gaul. Another consideration may have been that new methods of administration often followed conversion, whether directly from the newly introduced church or indirectly from other Christian kingdoms.

Evidence from Bede suggests that although Æthelberht encouraged conversion, he was unable to compel his subjects to become Christians. The historian R. A. Markus feels that this was due to a strong pagan presence in the kingdom, which forced the king to rely on indirect means including royal patronage and friendship to secure conversions. For Markus, this is demonstrated by the way in which Bede describes the king's conversion efforts, which when a subject converted, were to "rejoice at their conversion" and to "hold believers in greater affection".

616: Eadbald's pagan backlash

Eadbald came to the throne on the death of his father on 24 February 616, or possibly 618. Although Æthelberht had been Christian since about 600 and his wife Bertha was also Christian, Eadbald was a pagan. Bertha died sometime before Eadbald's accession, and Æthelberht remarried. The name of Æthelberht's second wife is not recorded, but it seems likely that she was a pagan, since on his death she married Eadbald, her stepson: a marriage between a stepmother and stepson was forbidden by the church.

Bede records that Eadbald's repudiation of Christianity was a "severe setback" to the growth of the church. Sæberht, the king of Essex, had become a Christian under Æthelberht's influence, but on Sæberht's death, at about the same time, his sons expelled Mellitus, the bishop of London. According to Bede, Eadbald was punished for his faithlessness by "frequent fits of insanity", and possession by an "evil spirit" (perhaps referring to epileptic fits), but was eventually persuaded to give up his wife and adopt Christianity. Eadbald's second wife, Ymme, was Frankish, and it may well be that Kent's strong connections with Francia were a factor in Eadbald's conversion. It is likely that the missionaries in Canterbury had Frankish support. In the 620s, Eadbald's sister Æthelburg came to Kent, but sent her children to the court of King Dagobert I in Francia; in addition to the diplomatic connections, trade with the Franks was important to Kent. It is thought likely that Frankish pressure had been influential in persuading Æthelberht to become Christian, and Eadbald's conversion and marriage to Ymme are likely to have been closely connected to diplomatic decisions.

Two graves from a well-preserved sixth and seventh-century Anglo-Saxon cemetery at Finglesham have yielded a bronze pendant and a gilt buckle with designs that are related to each other and may be symbolic of religious activity involving the Germanic deity Woden. These objects probably date from the period of the pagan reaction.

Bede's account
Bede's account of Eadbald's rejection of the church and subsequent conversion is quite detailed, but not without some internal inconsistencies. Bede's version of events are laid out as follows:

24 February 616: Æthelberht dies and Eadbald succeeds.
616: Eadbald leads a pagan reaction to Christianity. He marries his stepmother, contrary to church law, and he refuses baptism. At about this time Mellitus, bishop of London is expelled by the sons of Sæberht in Essex and goes to Kent.
616: Mellitus and Justus, bishop of Rochester, leave Kent for Francia.
616/617: Sometime after Mellitus and Justus depart, Laurence, the archbishop of Canterbury, plans to leave for Francia, but has a vision in which St Peter scourges him. In the morning he shows the scars to Eadbald who is converted to Christianity as a result.
617: Justus and Mellitus both return from Francia, "the year after they left". Justus is restored to Rochester.
c. 619: Laurence dies, and Mellitus becomes archbishop of Canterbury.
619–624: Eadbald builds a church which is consecrated by Archbishop Mellitus.
24 April 624: Mellitus dies and Justus succeeds him as archbishop of Canterbury.
624: after Justus's succession, Pope Boniface writes to him to say that he has heard in letters from King Aduluald (possibly a scribal error for Eadbald) of the king's conversion to Christianity. Boniface sends the pallium with this letter, adding that it is only to be worn when celebrating "the Holy Mysteries".
By 625 Edwin of Deira, king of Northumbria, asks for the hand in marriage of Æthelburg, Eadbald's sister. Edwin is told he must allow her to practice Christianity and must consider baptism himself.
21 July 625: Justus consecrates Paulinus bishop of York.
July or later in 625: Edwin agrees to the terms and Æthelburg travels to Northumbria, accompanied by Paulinus.
Easter 626: Æthelburg is delivered of a daughter, Eanflæd.
626: Edwin completes a military campaign against the West Saxons. At "about this time" Boniface writes to both Edwin and Æthelburg. The letter to Edwin urges him to accept Christianity and refers to the conversion of Eadbald. The letter to Æthelburg mentions that the pope has recently heard the news of Eadbald's conversion, and encourages her to work for the conversion of her husband, Edwin.

Alternative chronology
Although Bede's narrative is widely accepted, an alternative chronology has been proposed by D.P. Kirby. Kirby points out that Boniface's letter to Æthelburg makes it clear that the news of Eadbald's conversion is recent, and that it is unthinkable that Boniface would not have been kept up to date on the status of Eadbald's conversion. Hence Eadbald must have been converted by Justus, as is implied by Boniface's letter to Justus. The pallium accompanying that letter indicates Justus was archbishop by that time, and the duration of Mellitus's archiepiscopate means that even if Bede's dates are somewhat wrong in other particulars, Eadbald was converted no earlier than 621, and no later than April 624, since Mellitus consecrated a church for Eadbald before his death in that month. The account of Laurence's miraculous scourging by Peter can be disregarded as a later hagiographical invention of the monastery of St Augustine's, Canterbury.

As mentioned above, it has been suggested that King "Aduluald" in the letter to Justus is a real king Æthelwald, perhaps a junior king of west Kent. In that case, it would appear that Laurence converted Eadbald, and Justus converted Æthelwald. It has also been suggested that the pallium did not indicate Justus was archbishop since Justus is told the limited circumstances in which he may wear it; however, the same phrasing occurs in the letter conveying the pallium to Archbishop Augustine, also quoted in Bede. Another possibility is that the letter was originally two letters. In this view, Bede has conflated the letter conveying the pallium with the letter congratulating Justus on the conversion, which according to Bede's account was seven or so years earlier; but the grammatical details on which this suggestion is based are not unique to this letter, and as a result it is usually considered to be a single composition.

The letter to Æthelburg makes it clear that she was already married at the time the news of Eadbald's conversion reached Rome. This is quite inconsistent with the earlier date Bede gives for Eadbald's acceptance of Christianity, and it has been suggested in Bede's defence that Æthelburg married Edwin substantially earlier and stayed in Kent until 625 before travelling to Northumbria and that the letter was written while she was in Kent. However, it would appear from Boniface's letter that Boniface thought of Æthelburg as being at her husband's side. It also appears that the letter to Justus was written after the letters to Edwin and Æthelburg, rather than before, as Bede has it; Boniface's letter to Edwin and Æthelburg indicates he had the news from messengers, but when he wrote to Justus he had heard from the king himself.

The story of Æthelburg's marriage being dependent on Edwin allowing her to practice her faith has been questioned since revising the chronology makes it likely, though not certain, that the marriage was arranged before Eadbald's conversion. In this view, it would have been the church that objected to the marriage, and Æthelburg would have been Christian before Eadbald's conversion. The story of Paulinus's consecration is also problematic as he was not consecrated until at least 625 and possibly later, which is after the latest possible date for Æthelburg's marriage. However, it may be that he traveled to Northumbria prior to his consecration and only later became bishop.

A revised chronology of some of these events follows, taking the above considerations into account.
616: Eadbald leads a pagan reaction to Christianity.
616: Mellitus and Justus, bishop of Rochester, leave Kent for Francia.
c. 619: Laurence dies, and Mellitus becomes archbishop of Canterbury.
Early 624?: Justus converts Eadbald. Messengers go to Rome. Also at about this time Æthelburg's marriage to Edwin is arranged, perhaps before the conversion. Eadbald builds a church, and Mellitus consecrates it.
24 April 624: Mellitus dies and Justus succeeds him as archbishop of Canterbury.
Mid 624: Edwin agrees to the marriage terms and Æthelburg travels to Northumbria, accompanied by Paulinus.
Later 624: the pope receives news of Eadbald's conversion and writes to Æthelburg and Edwin.
Still later 624: the pope hears from Eadbald of his conversion and also hears of Mellitus's death. He writes to Justus to send him the pallium.
21 July 625 or 626: Justus consecrates Paulinus bishop of York.

This timeline extends the duration of the pagan reaction from less than a year, in Bede's narrative, to about eight years. This represents a more serious setback for the church.

640: Eorcenberht orders idols destroyed
According to Bede (HE III.8), Eorcenberht was the first king in Britain to command that pagan "idols" (cult images) be destroyed and that Lent be observed. It has been suggested that these orders may have been officially committed to writing, in the tradition of Kentish law-codes initiated by Æthelberht, but no such text survives. This indicates that while King Eadbald had converted at least 16 years previously, the general population were still openly pagan in 640.

Essex, 604–665
604: Sæberht of Essex is baptised by Mellitus
616: Sexred and Sæward of Essex are crowned: pagan resurgence
653: Sigeberht the Good is baptized
660: Swithhelm of Essex is crowned: pagan resurgence
662: Swithhelm is baptized
665: Sighere of Essex leads a pagan resurgence 
665: Jaruman is sent by Wulfhere of Mercia to reconvert the East Saxons

Sæbert of Essex was baptised by Mellitus in 604, but following his death in 616 his sons Sexred and Sæward drove Melitus out and “encouraged their people to return to the old gods”. Mellitus returned to Essex when Eadbald of Kent converted, but pagans drove him out again. Essex remained officially pagan until 653 when Oswy of Northumbria persuaded Sigeberht the Good to convert and allow Cedd to preach there. In 660 Sigeberht was killed by his pagan brothers for being too accommodating to Christianity. Swithhelm took over, but Æthelwold of East Anglia persuaded him to convert in 662. Swithhelm died in 664 and his two cousins Sighere and Sæbbi ruled Essex jointly. While there is no mention of Sighere accepting Christianity in the first place when a plague broke out in 665 he “abandoned the mysteries of the Christian faith and relapsed into paganism”. The people in Sighere's half of Essex became openly pagan once again, but Sæbbi's ally Wulfhere of Merica sent the Jaruman to convert them and made Sighere marry his niece Osyth, who he later divorced. Sighere was the last pagan king of Essex.

East Anglia, 604–630

604: Rædwald is baptized
Rædwald of East Anglia received the Christian sacraments from Mellitus in Kent, presumably at the invitation of Æthelberht who may have been his baptismal sponsor. The date of this initiation is not exactly known, but since it is claimed that Augustine (d. c 604) dedicated a church near Ely, it may have followed Saebert's conversion fairly swiftly. In this way, Rædwald became aligned with Æthelberht's system of authority. Bede states that even during Æthelbert's lifetime Rædwald was building up the leadership of the southern English for his own nation of East Angles.

In East Anglia Rædwald's conversion was not universally acceptable to his household, nor by his wife. She and her pagan teachers probably persuaded him to default in part from his commitment to it. In his temple, therefore, there were two altars, one dedicated to Christ, and one for dedications to the Anglo-Saxon gods. Raedwald is considered the most likely candidate for the Sutton Hoo ship burial, which displays both pagan and Christian iconography.

In 616 the pagan backlash in Kent and Essex left Rædwald the only (partially) Christian king in the Anglo-Saxon kingdoms. Rædwald died in 624 and was succeeded by his son Eorpwald.

627: Eorpwald is baptized
Paulinus undertook the conversion of the Northumbrian people, and also those of the Kingdom of Lindsey (Lincolnshire) and East Anglia. This Christian patronage helped to affirm Edwin's position as senior ruler of the English, and until his final confrontation with Cadwallon ap Cadfan of Gwynedd in 632-3 he also held the British or Welsh powers under his dominion.

It was at Edwin's prompting that Eorpwald, together with his kingdom, received the Christian faith and sacraments. Eorpwald was therefore not yet a Christian during his father's lifetime nor at his own accession. It is not known whether his baptism took place in East Anglia, Northumbria or Kent, but it is very likely that Edwin, now a senior ruler, was his sponsor at baptism. The conversion had the political benefit of bringing the entire eastern seaboard from Northumbria to Kent under the dominion of Christian rulers in alliance with Edwin, with the single exception of the Essex.

627: Ricberht's Pagan backlash
Not long after his conversion Eorpwald was slain (occisus) by a pagan (viro gentili) named Ricberht. The circumstances are not recorded so that it is not known whether Ricberht represented an internal East Anglian opposition to Christian rule, or if he was an emissary from an external power wishing to diminish Edwin's influence.

Bede states that after the slaying of Eorpwald the kingdom reverted to heathen rule (in errore versata est) for three years. This does not necessarily mean an overt struggle between the worship of the Anglo-Saxon gods and the worship of Christ, but could equally express a conflict in the political allegiances which Edwin's rise to power had prompted. The attribution of these three years to a supposed rule of Ricberht is a banner of convenience, though the fact that his name was remembered at all (when East Anglian history of this period is dependent upon very fragmentary records) indicates that he was a person of some importance.

630: Sigeberht of East Anglia returns from exile
After the interregnum prompted by Eorpwald's assassination, Sigeberht was recalled from Gaul to become ruler of the East Angles. It is likely that he gained the kingdom by military means because his prowess as a military commander was later remembered. During his reign part of the Kingdom was governed by his kinsman Ecgric, the relationship described by the Latin term cognatus. This may mean that Ecgric was a son of Rædwald. However, some authorities consider Ecgric to be the same person as Æthilric, named in the East Anglian tally (in the Anglian Collection) as a son of Eni, Rædwald's brother. Whoever Ecgric was, Sigeberht had equal or senior power while he ruled, because the influence of his religious patronage was felt both in eastern and western parts of the kingdom.

Sigeberht's Christian conversion may have been a decisive factor in his achieving royal power, since at that time Edwin of Northumbria (616-632/3) was the senior English king, and only he and Eadbald of Kent were Christian rulers. Eadbald certainly had contacts with the Frankish rulers. After Dagobert succeeded Clothar II in Francia in 628, Sigeberht's emergence helped to strengthen the English conversion upon which Edwin's power rested. Sigeberht is likely to have encouraged the conversion of Ecgric if he was not already Christian. Edwin's encouragement took shape in the marriage of his grand-niece Hereswith, sister of Saint Hilda, to Æthilric, Rædwald's nephew. Hereswith and Hild were under Edwin's protection and were baptised with him in 626. This marriage held the presumption that Æthilric was, or would become, Christian, and probably also that he should at some time become King of East Anglia.

Bede relates that the East Anglian apostle Saint Felix came to England from Burgundy as a missionary bishop, and was sent by Honorius, the Archbishop of Canterbury to assist Sigeberht. William of Malmesbury has the later story that Felix accompanied Sigeberht to East Anglia. In either case, this dates Sigeberht's accession to c629-630, because Felix was Bishop for 17 years, his successor Thomas for five, and his successor Berhtgisl Boniface for 17 - and Berhtgisl died in around 669. Sigeberht established the bishop's seat of his kingdom for Felix at Dommoc, claimed variously for Dunwich or Walton, Felixstowe (both coastal sites in Suffolk). If at Walton (as Rochester claimed during the thirteenth century), the site of Dommoc may have been within the precinct of a Roman fort which formerly stood there.

Sigeberht also established a school in his kingdom for boys to be taught reading and writing in Latin, on the model that he had witnessed in Gaul. Felix assisted him by obtaining teachers of the kind who taught in Kent. Paulinus of York was from 633 to 644 bishop of Rochester on the Medway, then the nearest bishopric in Kent to East Anglia. Paulinus had (according to the Whitby Life of Gregory the Great) been connected with the court of Rædwald during the exile of Edwin.

The allegiance of Felix to Canterbury determined the Roman basis of the East Anglian Church, though his training in Burgundy may have been coloured by the teaching of the Irish missionary Columbanus in Luxeuil. In around 633, perhaps shortly before Aidan was sent to Lindisfarne from Iona, the Irish royal hermit and missionary Fursey came from the Athlone area with his priests and brethren to East Anglia. Sigeberht granted him a monastery site in an old Roman fort called Cnobheresburg, usually identified as Burgh Castle near Yarmouth. Felix and Fursey both effected many conversions and established churches in Sigeberht's kingdom. Bede records that Archbishop Honorius and Bishop Felix much admired the work of Aidan of Lindisfarne. Therefore, it is likely that they also appreciated Fursey, whose community also lived according to the ascetic principles of Irish Christianity.

Northumbria, 625–634

 625: Paulinus begins preaching
 627: Edwin is baptised
 633: Osric and Eanfrith of Bernicia are crowned: Heathen resurgence
 634: Oswald is crowned

Paulinus arrived in Bernicia in 625 to convince Edwin to accept baptism. Edwin allowed his daughter Eanfled to be baptised, and vowed to accept baptism himself if his campaign against Cwichelm of Wessex was successful. Bede recounts that Edwin was finally baptised on 12 April 627, but he does not appear to have made any effort to convert his subjects. He died in 633 and Osric and Eanfrith, his cousin and nephew respectively, took over Bernicia and Deira. Osric and Eanfrith had both accepted baptism while in exile with the Picts, but upon taking their thrones reverted their kingdoms to paganism. They were both killed by Cadwallon ap Cadfan of Gwynedd in 634, who was in turn killed by Eanfrith's brother Oswald in the same year. Oswald had been baptised while in exile with the Scots, and had persuaded his council to accept baptism if they were victorious against Cadwallon.  Oswald requested missionaries to convert the pagan Bernicians and Deirans. The first bishop to try eventually gave up and returned to Iona, reporting that the Northumbrians were ardently pagan and refusing to convert. Aidan arrived in 635 and spent the rest of his life converting the Northumbrians, dying in 651.

Mercia, 653–655

 653: Preaching begins
 655: Peada is crowned

The pagan King Penda allowed Christian missionaries to begin preaching in Mercia in 653 when his son Peada was baptised. Peada had accepted baptism in order to marry Alhflæd, the daughter of Oswiu of Bernicia. Penda was killed in battle against Oswiu on 15 November 655, and Peada took the throne, becoming the first Christian king. Unusually Mercia had no official relapse into paganism.

Sussex, 675–681

 675: Æthelwealh is baptised
 681: Wilfrid begins preaching

Æthelwealh of Sussex was baptised in Mercia sometime during or just before 675, probably as a condition of marrying the Christian Queen Eafa of the Hwicce. In 681 Wilfrid arrived in Sussex to begin converting the general population. Bede says Wulfhere had had him converted “not long previously”, but it couldn’t have been later than 675 because that is when Wulfhere died. Æthelwealh gave Wilfrid land in Selsey where he founded Selsey Abbey. While there Wilfrid met with Cædwalla of Wessex and guaranteed support for his invasion of Sussex (despite Æthelwealh granting him land and allowing him to preach in his kingdom). In 685 Cædwalla, who was now King of Wessex, invaded Sussex and killed Æthelwealh. Two ealdormen of Æthelwealh, Berthun and Andhun, drove him out and administered the kingdom from then on. Their religious affiliation is not recorded. In 686 Wilfrid was recalled to York, Berthun and Andhun attacked Kent, Berthun was killed somewhere along the line and Sussex was conquered by Cædwalla.

Wessex, 603–685

 603: Augustine of Canterbury begins preaching (possibly apocryphal)
 635: Cynegils of Wessex and Cwichelm of Wessex are baptised
 643: Cenwalh is crowned: Heathen resurgence
 655: Cenwalh returns from exile, now baptized
 676: Centwine is crowned, Heathen resurgence
 685: Cædwalla is crowned, unbaptized but pro-Christian

The monk Goscelin recorded a short legend that after converting Æthelberht of Kent, Augustine traveled into Wessex to convert the population. In the village of Cernel the locals jeered at him and drove him out of town, pinning fish to him in mockery of his religion. According to this legend Augustine eventually returned and converted them by smashing their idol. Bede, however, says that the West Saxons were “completely heathen” until 635 when Birinus began preaching there. The joint kings Cynigils and Cwichelm were baptised in 635 or 636 with King Oswin of Northumbria as their godfather, and Bede claims the common population were converted also. When Cynegils died in 643 his son Cenwalh ascended to the throne; Bede said of Cenwalh, that he “refused to embrace the mysteries of the faith, and of the heavenly kingdom; and not long after also he lost the dominion of his earthly kingdom; for he put away the sister of Penda, king of the Mercians, whom he had married, and took another wife; whereupon a war ensuing, he was by him expelled his kingdom". The pagan King Penda took over Wessex and Cenwalh accepted baptism while under the protection of the Christian king Anna of East Anglia. Penda was killed in 655 allowing the now-Christian Cenwalh to return to Wessex. He was succeeded by his widow Seaxburh and then Æscwine; their religion is unknown. In 676 Centwine took the throne. Centwine was a Heathen throughout his reign, but abdicated to become a Christian monk. Cædwalla became king of Wessex in 685 or 686, and his religion is difficult to determine. He remained unbaptised throughout his entire reign, but supported Christianity. Before attacking the pagan Isle of Wight, be vowed to give 1/4 of the land and booty to the Church if he was successful, a vow he fulfilled by granting estates to Wilfrid. He also “allowed” the heirs of Arwald, the last pagan King of Wight, to be baptised before he executed them. He is recorded elsewhere granting land to the church. Before conquering Sussex he worked with the Bishops Wilfrid and Eorcenwald to establish an ecclesiastical structure there. He was seriously wounded while conquering the Isle of Wight in 686. In 688 he abdicated and went on a pilgrimage to Rome and was baptised by Pope Sergius I on 10 April 689, dying 10 days later from his wounds.

His successor Ine issued a law code in 695 which reveal him to be a Christian. However, one of Ine's laws prescribed a fine for failing to baptise one's children, and another fine for failing to tithe, which indicates the common population were slow to adopt Christian habits voluntarily.

Isle of Wight, 661–686
 661: Wulfhere of Mercia invades, islanders forcibly baptized
 661: Wulfhere of Mercia leaves, islanders immediately return to Heathenism
 686: Cædwalla of Wessex invades, islanders ethnically cleansed and Kingdom annexed

The Jutes of the Isle of Wight were forcibly baptised when Wulfhere invaded in 661. When Wulfhere returned to Mercia he left the priest Eoppa in Wight, but he could not stop the Islanders quickly reverting to open paganism. Wight remained pagan until 686 when it was invaded by the Christian sympathiser Cædwalla of Wessex. Their pagan King Arwald was killed in battle, and his heirs were baptised and executed. Most of the pagan population was purportedly exterminated and replaced with Christian West Saxons. Those who remained were forced to accept baptism and also the West Saxon dialect, and the Isle of Wight was incorporated into the Kingdom of Wessex. King Arwald was the last English King to die a pagan.

See also
Gregorian mission
Christianity in Anglo-Saxon England

Notes

References

Sources

Primary sources

Secondary sources
 
 
 
 
 
 
 
 
 
 
 
 
 
 
 
 
 
 
 
 
 
 
 
 
 
 
 
 
 
 
 
 
 
 
 
 
 
 
 
 
 
 
 
 
 
 
 
  Accessed on 10 May 2009
 
 
 
 
 
 
 
 
 

 
England